Flat Creek is a stream in Monroe and Randolph counties in the U.S. state of Missouri. It is a tributary of the Middle Fork of the Salt River.

Flat Creek was so named on account of its flat flood plain.

See also
List of rivers of Missouri

References

Rivers of Monroe County, Missouri
Rivers of Randolph County, Missouri
Rivers of Missouri